Togabotys is a genus of moths of the family Crambidae. It contains only a single species, Togabotys fuscolineatalis, which is found in Japan.

References

Natural History Museum Lepidoptera genus database

Pyraustinae
Crambidae genera